is a Japanese video game developed and published by Sega for the Sega Saturn in 1995. It is an action role-playing video game based on the anime series of the same title (Magic Knight Rayearth).  Though one of the first games for the Saturn, it became the last Saturn game released in North America, chiefly due to its prolonged internationalization and localization. The game was released in North America by Working Designs in 1998.

The game focuses on three characters who travel the world of Cephiro to rescue an abducted princess named Emerald.

At least five other video games based on the anime series have been released: two for the Game Boy (the second one with the title Mahou Kishi Rayearth 2nd: The Missing Colors), one for the Super Famicom, and two for the Sega Game Gear (the second game subtitled "Making of Magic Knight"). All six are completely different games, not ports.

Plot
Though there are a number of events which are exclusive to the video game, the overall plot is very similar to the first story arc in the manga and anime, with eighth-grade girls Hikaru Shidou, Umi Ryuuzaki and Fuu Hououji finding themselves drawn from their respective field trips to the Tokyo Tower into the world of Cephiro. There, Master Mage Clef inform them that, in order to return to Tokyo, the three girls must become the Magic Knights and rescue Cephiro's current Pillar, Princess Emeraude (named as Princess Emerald in the English version), from her abductor, the high priest and antagonist Zagato (named as Zagat in the English version).

All of the characters from the first arc of the manga are present in the game, as well as anime-exclusive character Inouva. However, the game presents several new locations and characters, thus considerably expanding the overall plot. The player can also read each of the girls' journals, which receive new entries after key events in the game, providing their individual insights on the events.

Unlike in the manga and anime, all of Zagato's minions die throughout the game, including Ascot, Caldina and Rafarga.

Gameplay

Throughout the game, the player controls a party of three characters. However, only one character can battle at a time; though the other two characters will follow behind the active character, they cannot attack and are unaffected by all enemy attacks and even environmental hazards. The player can instantly change the active character at any time. In essence, the three characters confront the enemies, puzzles, and assorted threats of the game in a tag team fashion.

Unlike most RPGs, character upgrades and magic spells are mostly acquired upon progressing to certain points in the game, rather than by independent accomplishments. (The exceptions are maximum HP and maximum MP, which are increased by finding special items.) This is much like the Saturn's first RPG, Virtual Hydlide, with the important difference that weapons and armor in Magic Knight Rayearth are upgraded as part of general level ups and do not exist as distinct gameplay elements.

While the anime and manga both have the Magic Knights using color-coordinated swords, in the game only Hikaru uses a sword, while Umi uses a foil and Fuu a bow and arrow. Each of the three weapons has its own advantages and disadvantages. For instance, the bow works long range but requires precise aim, whereas the sword slices with broad strokes that make it easy to hit enemies but is short range only. The need to aim the bow is mostly removed once it is upgraded, since Fuu can then charge the weapon to make it "lock on" to the nearest target. However, unlike the sword and foil, the bow's attack power does not increase when it is charged up.

Development 
Magic Knight Rayearth is based on the anime by Clamp of the same name. The game was one of 12 Sega Saturn games announced when the system was first unveiled at the June 1994 Tokyo Toy Show.

Localization 
The localization of the game was handled by Working Designs. In an interview published in June 1996, the company said that the game was one of the biggest localization projects the company had ever undertaken. They pointed to the audio and dubbing alone taking up to several months alone to complete, and the game being heavily in text as reasons for why the project was so big. At the time, they said they were aiming for a late summer 1996 release date.

The North American release was originally slated for July 1996, but was delayed more than two years.

Working Designs made a number of changes to the game in the localization process. As they regarded the Japanese version to be excessively easy, they enhanced the enemies' artificial intelligence and made them faster. As noted in the instruction booklet, Working Designs' opening animation would have mimicked the Japanese version of the game (gems morphing into the logo) but once Working Designs "were made aware of a logo created for the English Rayearth" by Media Blasters, they decided to change the opening to incorporate the new logo. They also left out the voice acting for inconsequential town dialogue which appeared in the Japanese version, instead adding voice acting to the player characters' diary entries, as well as rendering the diary text to appear handwritten.

As written in the translation notes in the instruction manual of the North American version, some of the source code to the original Japanese version had been lost due to a hard drive crash. The missing code was completely rebuilt for the US version.

Three versions of the opening song were recorded, two of which are accessible on the game disk. Working Designs was unable to acquire the original Japanese opening theme, "Yuzurenai Negai" by Naomi Tamura, for the English release, and instead used the melody of the Japanese version with different lyrics. The original version was only released on Working Design's website, and had an entirely different singer and instrumentals than the two versions of the song that were released on the game. This version was a lot closer to the original anime's theme, but with Working Designs' English lyrics.

The game, as with most of Working Designs' translated titles, was packaged with different artwork on the CDs to increase their value among collectors. The CDs came with three different designs, one for each of the game's heroines.

Reception

The game currently holds a 70.03% average on GameRankings.

On release in Japan, in 1995, Famitsu magazine scored the game a 26 out of 40.<ref name=fami>New Games Cross Review - 魔法騎士レイアース. Weekly Famitsu. No.352. Pg.29. 15 September 1995.</ref> The localized version received mild to positive scores upon its release in North America in 1998. The game received a 5.1 mediocre review from Andrew Vestal of GameSpot. Though he found no problems with the game itself, he considered the localization of a three-year-old game to be a wasted effort due to the aging of the graphics, concluding that "Magic Knight Rayearth is too little, too late". Game Informer scored the game 7 out of 10, and called it rather dated. EGM scored the game 7.12 out of 10.Retro Gamer'' included it on their list of ten essential Saturn imports as "easily the best playable import RPG, thanks to a highly entertaining localisation by Working Designs, its fun combat system (you effectively control one character at a time, switching between them tag-team style) and some delightful 2D visuals".

Notes

References

External links 
 Magic Knight Rayearth at GameFAQs
 Magic Knight Rayearth at Giant Bomb
 Magic Knight Rayearth at MobyGames

1995 video games
Action role-playing video games
Magic Knight Rayearth
Video games about magic
Video games about mecha
Science fantasy video games
Sega Saturn games
Sega Saturn-only games
Magical girl video games
Video games developed in Japan
Working Designs